Andalusi is an adjective referring to anything of al-Andalus.

It may refer to:

al-Andalusi, a surname or nisba
Andalusi Arabic, the Arabic of al-Andalus
Andalusi architecture
Andalusi classical music

See also
Andalusian (disambiguation)